Sally Ann Furnace Complex is a historic iron furnace complex site located at Rockland Township, Berks County, Pennsylvania. It includes the remains of furnace, barns, stable, storage sheds, grist mill, and bake ovens.  The furnace was built in 1791 along Sacony Creek and once stood 32 feet high.  Adjacent to the mill is a 1 1/2-story stone dwelling built in 1798.  In 1814, a 2 1/2-story rectangular, stuccoed stone mansion house was added.  It is five bays by two bays, and has a gable roof with dormers.  Also on the property is a  1 1/2-story, stone company store and storekeeper's residence, and 2 1/2-story stuccoed stone granary.

It was added to the National Register of Historic Places in 1976.

References

External links
Waymarking.com:Sally Ann Furnace Complex - Sally Ann, PA

Industrial buildings and structures on the National Register of Historic Places in Pennsylvania
Houses completed in 1814
Buildings and structures in Berks County, Pennsylvania
National Register of Historic Places in Berks County, Pennsylvania